Acupalpus ibericus is an insect-eating ground beetle of the Acupalpus genus.

References

ibericus
Beetles described in 1988